Ailly may refer to:
 Pierre d'Ailly, a French theologian
 Ailly, Eure, a commune of France